Epidemiological studies of the health effects of low levels of ionizing radiation, in particular the incidence and mortality from various forms of cancer, have been carried out in different population groups exposed to such radiation. These have included survivors of the atomic bombings of Hiroshima and Nagasaki in 1945, workers at nuclear reactors, and medical patients treated with X-rays.

Life span studies of atomic bomb survivors

Survivors of the atomic bomb explosions at Hiroshima and Nagasaki, Japan have been the subjects of a Life Span Study (LSS), which has provided valuable epidemiological data.

The LSS population went through several changes:
 1945 – There were some 93,000 individuals, either living in Hiroshima or Nagasaki, Japan.
 1950 – An additional 37,000 were registered by this time, for a total of 130,000 LSS members.

However, some 44,000 individuals were censured or excluded from the LSS project, so there remained about 86,000 people who were followed through the study.  There is a gap in knowledge of the earliest cancer that developed in the first few years after the war, which impacts the assessment of leukemia to an important extent and for solid cancers to a minor extent.  Table 1 shows summary statistics of the number of persons and deaths for different dose groups. These comparisons show that the doses that were received by the LSS population overlap strongly with the doses that are of concern to NASA Exploration mission (i.e., 50 to 2,000 milliSieverts (mSv)).

Figure 1 shows the dose response for the excess relative risk (ERR) for all solid cancers from Preston et al. Tables 2 and 3 show several summary parameters for tissue-specific cancer mortality risks for females and males, respectively, including estimates of ERR, excess absolute risk (EAR), and percentage attributable risks.  Cancer incidence risks from low-LET radiation are about 60% higher than cancer mortality risks.

Other human studies
The BEIR VII Report contains an extensive review of data sets from human populations, including nuclear reactor workers and patients who were treated with radiation.  The recent report from Cardis et al. describes a meta-analysis for reactor workers from several countries.  A meta-analysis at specific cancer sites, including breast, lung, and leukemia, has also been performed. These studies require adjustments for photon energy, dose-rate, and country of origin as well as adjustments made in single population studies.  Table 4 shows the results that are derived from Preston et al. for a meta-analysis of breast cancer risks in eight populations, including the atomic-bomb survivors.  The median ERR varies by slightly more than a factor of two, but confidence levels significantly overlap.  Adjustments for photon energy or dose-rate and fractionation have not been made.  These types of analysis lend confidence to risk assessments as well as showing the limitations of such data sets.

Of special interest to NASA is the dependence on age at exposure of low-LET cancer risk projections. The BEIR VII report prefers models that show less than a 25% reduction in risk over the range from 35 to 55 years, while NCRP Report No. 132 shows about a two-fold reduction over this range.

See also
 Radiobiology

References

Epidemiology
Occupational safety and health
Atomic bombings of Hiroshima and Nagasaki
Radiation health effects
Space medicine